Grégoire "Gusty" Laurent (4 March 1906 in Le Sablon, France – 22 March 1985) was a Luxembourgian boxer who competed in the 1924 Summer Olympics. In 1924 he was eliminated in the first round of the lightweight class after losing his fight to Charles Petersen.

References

External links
 Part 5 the boxing tournament
 Profile at the Luxembourg Olympians' Association 
 

1906 births
1985 deaths
Sportspeople from Moselle (department)
Luxembourgian male boxers
Lightweight boxers
Olympic boxers of Luxembourg
Boxers at the 1924 Summer Olympics